The Voorman Problem is a 2011 British short film directed by Mark Gill, who also co-wrote the screenplay and edited the film with producer Baldwin Li, who also wrote the score. It is adapted from "Panopticon", a film within a story from the 2001 novel number9dream by David Mitchell, with Martin Freeman starring as a prison psychiatrist, and Tom Hollander as his patient.

The film premiered at the 2011 Warsaw Film Festival. It was nominated for the Academy Award for Best Live Action Short Film and the BAFTA Award for Best Short Film.

Plot

Dr. Williams (played by Martin Freeman) is hired by Governor Bentley (Simon Griffiths) to work as a prison psychiatrist after "The War in the East" has produced a doctor shortage. Williams is informed about the Voorman problem; a prisoner named Voorman (Tom Hollander) is convinced that he is a god and has convinced the rest of the prisoners who spend all day chanting in worship. It is unclear what Voorman's crime is due to a computer malfunction.

Williams interviews a straitjacketed Voorman in a locked room in the prison. Voorman calmly explains that he is a god, and that he created the world exactly nine days ago. When the Doctor objects, Voorman suggests a test of his powers. He will eliminate Belgium as proof he is a god.

At home a frustrated Williams tells his wife about the case. He laughingly brings the claim that Voorman will eliminate Belgium. His wife is confused, having no idea what Belgium is. Williams attempts to show her Belgium in an atlas but finds it is gone and replaced with a body of water called "Walloon Lagoon."

Back at the prison, Williams is baffled by the lack of any evidence of Belgium, but refuses to believe in Voorman's divinity. Voorman expresses his exhaustion with being a god and suggests the two switch places. In a flash the two have switched places, Voorman dressed as the well dressed doctor, and Williams disheveled and in a straitjacket. Williams calls for the guards and Voorman starts to leave stating that it is no use. As he leaves, Voorman advises Williams to "watch North Korea."

Voorman leaves the room as the sounds of the prisoners chanting get louder.

Cast
Martin Freeman as Dr Williams
Tom Hollander as Voorman
Elisabeth Gray as Mrs. Williams
Simon Griffiths as Governor Bentley

References

External links
 
 

2011 comedy films
2011 films
2011 short films
British comedy short films
Films based on British novels
Films set in Belgium
Films shot in England
2010s English-language films